Nirupama Deepika Rajapaksa (born 13 April 1962) is a Sri Lankan politician, a former member of the Parliament of Sri Lanka and a former deputy minister.

Biography 

She herself, a Sinhalese Buddhist is married to an ethnic Tamil Hindu, Thirukkumaran Nadesan .

Rajapaksa is the niece of former Sri Lankan President and later Prime Minister Mahinda Rajapaksa. Her late father, George and them were first cousins (her late paternal grandfather, D. M. Rajapaksa and their late father, D. A. Rajapaksa were brothers).

Career 

She served as a deputy minister of water supply and drainage during the presidency of Mahinda Rajapaksa between 2010 and 2015.

Pandora Papers controversy 

Her name was mentioned in the Pandora Papers which were released in October 2021. It was revealed that she and her husband controlled a shell company they used to buy luxury apartments in London and Sydney, and to make investments. Nadesan set up other shell companies and trusts in secrecy jurisdictions, and he used them with the intention to obtain lucrative consulting contracts from foreign companies doing business with the Sri Lankan government and to buy artwork. Many reports related the fraudulent efforts as part of Rajapksa family’s undisclosed wealth in offshore countries.
ICiJ reports that Rajapaksa and Nadesan declined to answer ICIJ’s questions about their trusts and companies.

Departure from Sri Lanka

On 5 April during the ongoing 2022 Sri Lankan protests against the Sri Lankan government she left the country to Dubai.

See also

 List of political families in Sri Lanka

 Rajapaksa family

References

External links

 The Rajapaksa Ancestry

1962 births
Living people
Members of the 10th Parliament of Sri Lanka
Members of the 13th Parliament of Sri Lanka
Members of the 14th Parliament of Sri Lanka
Government ministers of Sri Lanka
Sri Lanka Freedom Party politicians
United People's Freedom Alliance politicians
Nirupama
Women legislators in Sri Lanka
20th-century Sri Lankan women politicians
21st-century Sri Lankan women politicians
Women government ministers of Sri Lanka
People named in the Pandora Papers